The 1986–87 UTEP Miners men's basketball team represented the University of Texas at El Paso in the 1986–87 college basketball season. The team was led by head coach Don Haskins. The Miners finished 25–7 (13–3 in WAC), won the conference regular season title, and reached the second round of the NCAA tournament.

Roster

Schedule and results

|-
!colspan=9 style=| Regular season

|-
!colspan=9 style=| WAC tournament

|-
!colspan=9 style=| NCAA tournament

Rankings

References

UTEP Miners men's basketball seasons
Utep
Utep